The 2010 Fergana Challenger was a professional tennis tournament played on outdoor hard courts. It was part of the 2010 ATP Challenger Tour. It took place in Fergana, Uzbekistan between May 17 and May 22, 2010.

ATP entrants

Seeds

Rankings are as of May 10, 2010.

Other entrants
The following players received wildcards into the singles main draw:
  Farrukh Dustov
  Murad Inoyatov
  Llia Starkov
  Vaja Uzakov

The following players received entry from the qualifying draw:
  Gong Maoxin
  Denys Molchanov
  Wu Di
  Zhang Ze

The following players received special exempt into the main draw:
  Jun Woong-Sun
  Lim Yong-Kyu

The following player received entry with a protected ranking:
  Tomáš Cakl

Champions

Singles

 Evgeny Kirillov def.  Zhang Ze, 6–3, 2–6, 6–2

Doubles

 Brendan Evans /  Toshihide Matsui def.  Gong Maoxin /  Li Zhe, 3–6, 6–3, [10–8]

References

External links
Official website
ITF search 

Fergana Challenger
Fergana Challenger